Opočno is a town in Rychnov nad Kněžnou District in the Hradec Králové Region of the Czech Republic. It has about 3,100 inhabitants. Opočno is known for the Opočno Castle, one of the most magnificent examples of Renaissance architecture in Bohemia. The historic town centre with the castle is well preserved and is protected by law as an urban monument zone.

Administrative parts

Villages of Čánka and Dobříkovec are administrative parts of Opočno.

Etymology
The name is derived from the Old Czech adjective opočný, meaning "stone" or "rock" (castle).

Geography
It lies in the Orlice Table. The town is situated on the Zlatý Stream and on the shore of the Broumar Pond.

History
Opočno was first mentioned in 1068 by Cosmas of Prague in his Chronica Boemorum, when there was a gord. In the early 14th century, Opočno was acquired by the Drslavic family, who had a Gothic castle built here, and a small town began to arise next to it.

In 1495, the Bohemian noble family of Trčka z Lípy became owners of Opočno. During their rule Opočno enjoyed a period of a significant economic growth, and the castle was rebuilt. After the extinction of the Trčka family, Opočno was acquired by the Colloredo family. In 1673, a Capuchin monastery was founded in Opočno.

In the 19th century, further development occurred. The district court and a hospital were established. The industrialization began with establishment of factories producing farm machinery and dairy products. This led to growth of the population.

During World War II, in 1942, the property of Colloredo-Mandsfeld family including the castle in Opočno was confiscated by the Nazis. The restitution claims of the Colloredo-Mansfeld between 1991 and 2017 were denied.

Demographics

Sights

The main sight is Opočno Castle. In 1560–1569, it was rebuilt in the Renaissance style, and after a fire in the late 17th century, Baroque modifications were made. In the castle park there is the French-style castle summer house from 1602.

In Opočno there are three churches. The parish Church of the Holy Trinity is located in the castle complex and is originally from the early 14th century. The Church of the Nativity of Jesus was originally a convent church of the Capuchin monastery. The monastery complex with the church is a unique complex of early Baroque buildings. The third church is the Church of the Virgin Mary in the old cemetery. The old church from the 17th centurx was rebuilt in 1810 to its current appearance. It now serves as a concert hall.

The historic centre of Opočno is formed by squares Kupkovo and Trčkovo with adjacent streets, and by the castle complex. On Trčkovo Square, there are valuable Renaissance and Baroque burgher houses.

Notable people

František Zdeněk Skuherský (1830–1892), composer
František Kupka (1871–1957), painter
Luboš Sluka (born 1928), composer
Ivo Ulich (born 1974), footballer
Jaroslav Plašil (born 1982), footballer
Taťána Kuchařová (born 1987), model, Miss World 2006

Twin towns – sister cities

Opočno is twinned with:
 Opoczno, Poland
 Puteaux, France
 Radków, Poland

References

External links

 
Populated places in Rychnov nad Kněžnou District
Cities and towns in the Czech Republic